KWIR-LP (107.1 FM) was a radio station licensed to Colorado Springs, Colorado, United States. The station was owned by Calvary Community Church. Previously owned by Rocky Mountain Calvary Chapel, the station was donated to Calvary Community Church for no consideration in January 2013. The transaction was consummated on April 24, 2013.

On January 28, 2016, the Federal Communications Commission (FCC) notified Calvary Community Church that the station's license was deemed to have expired effective July 31, 2014, due to the station having been silent for more than twelve months at that point. On the same day, the FCC deleted the station's call sign from its database.

References

External links
 

Defunct religious radio stations in the United States
WIR-LP
WIR-LP
Radio stations established in 2008
2008 establishments in Colorado
Defunct radio stations in the United States
Radio stations disestablished in 2016
2016 disestablishments in Colorado
WIR-LP